Tuterei Karewa  was a chief and a warrior of the Māori iwi (tribe) called the Ngāti Maru.  He has been depicted in multiple types of artwork, including photography, watercolor painting, and metalwork.  The facial tattoo featured on his face, called a moko, features prominently in these depictions.

Biography
Details regarding Karewa's birth and death are not documented.  Karewa acted as a chief of the Ngāti Maru.  Notes maintained by Māori historian W.T. Hammond noted that in the later part of his life, he was living in Kiri Kiri, Thames, and described him as a "handsomely tattooed old Maori warrior."  In the 1860s, Karewa also had some political involvement regarding land ownership in New Zealand.  Records indicate that in response to European interests in gold prospecting on their lands, Karewa participated in meetings of chiefs of the Hauraki region.  Correspondences detailing these meetings indicate Karewa acknowledged European control over certain regions, but maintained that the Hauraki chiefs had independent land rights.

Depictions in artwork

Karewa was the subject of several pieces of work.  Photographer Arthur James Iles documented Karewa in a series of portraits of Māori between 1890 and 1920. The photograph shows Karewa wearing a pihepihe, a type of cloak generally adorned cylindrical tags made of flax.   Iles subsequently used his work to have tin plates created overseas, one of which contained a small lithograph of Karewa on the outer edge of the plate among others.  He was also the subject of a watercolor painting by artist and soldier Horatio Gordon Robley wearing a garment similar to the Iles photograph.

Reviews of these depictions sometimes comment on the nature of Karewa's face markings, called moko.  In the photograph, reviewers have noted that Iles highlighted this tattoo after it was taken, possibly using black paint or another substance.  The Oceanic Art Society praised the quality of the facial markings, commenting that Karewa showed the moko "to great advantage."

Gallery

References

Ngāti Maru (Hauraki)
Year of birth unknown
Year of death unknown